Cizari or Kizari, also called Icizari or Ikizari (Ἰκίζαρι), was a settlement and fort of ancient Pontus, in the district Phazemonitis, on Lake Stiphane. It was deserted in Strabo's time, and there was a palace built near it.

Its site is located southwest of Lâdik, Asiatic Turkey.

References

Populated places in ancient Pontus
Former populated places in Turkey
History of Samsun Province
Ancient Greek archaeological sites in Turkey